1207 Ostenia, provisional designation , is a stony Eoan asteroid from the outer region of the asteroid belt, approximately 23 kilometers in diameter. It was discovered on 15 November 1931, by German astronomer Karl Reinmuth at Heidelberg Observatory in southwest Germany, and named for amateur astronomer Hans Osten.

Classification and orbit 

The S-type asteroid is a member of the Eos family, thought to have formed from a catastrophic collision of its parent body resulting in more than 4,000 known members of the family. It orbits the Sun at a distance of 2.8–3.3 AU once every 5 years and 3 months (1,920 days). Its orbit has an eccentricity of 0.09 and an inclination of 10° with respect to the ecliptic. Ostenias observation arc begins at Heidelberg with its official discovery observation. No precoveries were taken and no prior identifications were made.

Diameter and albedo 

According to the surveys carried out by the Infrared Astronomical Satellite IRAS and NASA's Wide-field Infrared Survey Explorer with its subsequent NEOWISE mission, Ostenia measures 21.925 and 22.93 kilometers in diameter, and its surface has an albedo of 0.176 and 0.1338, respectively. The Collaborative Asteroid Lightcurve Link derives an albedo of 0.1591 and a diameter of 23.05 kilometers with an absolute magnitude of 10.8.

Lightcurves 

In February 2006, photometric observations of Ostenia by Brian Warner at his Palmer Divide Observatory in Colorado Springs, Colorado (see ), were used to generate a well-defined lightcurve with a period of  hours and a variation in brightness of  magnitude.

Naming 

This minor planet was named after Hans Osten (1875–1936) a German amateur astronomer, orbit computer and business man. As a non-professional, Osten attracted attention with his precise calculations of comets and asteroids. He is known for calculating the orbit of 447 Valentine, taking into account perturbations by all major planets with such precision, that it was considered exemplary in the astronomical community. Osten received the silver Leibniz Medal in 1911. Naming citation was first mentioned in The Names of the Minor Planets by Paul Herget in 1955.

References

External links 
  
 Lightcurve plot of 1207 Ostenia, Palmer Divide Observatory, B. D. Warner (2006)
 Asteroid Lightcurve Database (LCDB), query form (info )
 Dictionary of Minor Planet Names, Google books
 Asteroids and comets rotation curves, CdR – Observatoire de Genève, Raoul Behrend
 Discovery Circumstances: Numbered Minor Planets (1)-(5000) – Minor Planet Center
 
 

001207
Discoveries by Karl Wilhelm Reinmuth
Named minor planets
19311115